The Great Distraction is the fourth studio album by English electronic music group Vessels, released on 29 September 2017 on Different Recordings. Critical reception was mixed to decent.

References 

2017 albums
Vessels (band) albums